Sutton-Newby House is a historic plantation house located near Hertford, Perquimans County, North Carolina.   It was built about 1745, and is a -story, four bay, frame dwelling with a brick end and gable roof. It originally had both ends in brick. It features a full-width, shed roofed front porch and massive double shouldered chimney.  It is a member of the small group of 18th century frame houses with brick ends in northeast North Carolina; the group includes the Myers-White House and the Old Brick House.

The house was added to the National Register of Historic Places in 1974.

References

External links

Plantation houses in North Carolina
Historic American Buildings Survey in North Carolina
Houses on the National Register of Historic Places in North Carolina
Houses completed in 1745
Houses in Perquimans County, North Carolina
National Register of Historic Places in Perquimans County, North Carolina
1745 establishments in North Carolina